Benjamin Steffan (born 12 January 1996) is a German ice dancer. With his skating partner, Jennifer Janse van Rensburg, he is the 2020 Santa Claus Cup champion, the 2021 Egna Dance Trophy silver medalist, the 2022 Bavarian Open champion, and the 2022 German national champion.

Programs

With Janse van Rensburg

With Hofstetter

With Steffan

Competitive highlights 
GP: Grand Prix; CS: Challenger Series; JGP: Junior Grand Prix

With Janse van Rensburg

With Hofstetter

With Steffan

With Barht

References

External links 
 
 
 
 
 

1996 births
Living people
German male ice dancers
Sportspeople from Chemnitz
Competitors at the 2017 Winter Universiade